The 9 September Front (Turkish: 9 Eylül Cephesi) was a secret Turkish Cypriot pro-taksim paramilitary organisation formed to counter the Greek Cypriot Fighter's Organization EOKA and Enosis.

History 
The organisation was formed to counter the activities of EOKA in 1955 by mostly untrained volunteers. Organisation failed to grow up to a national scale and be effective in all of Cyprus. In 1958, leaders of the organisation decided that they aren't enough to achieve their goals separately from other Turkish Cypriot organisations, and abolished itself to merge with Turkish Resistance Organisation.

References 

Cyprus dispute
Paramilitary organisations based in Cyprus
Cyprus Emergency
Organisations based in Northern Cyprus
Secession in Cyprus
Turkish nationalism in Cyprus
Turkish nationalist organizations